Aluthkade East Grama Niladhari Division is a Grama Niladhari Division of the Colombo Divisional Secretariat of Colombo District of Western Province, Sri Lanka.

Sri Lanka Law College, Hameed Al Husseinie College, Grand Mosque of Colombo, Ministry of Fisheries and Aquatic Resources Development, Trace City, Wolvendaal Church, Maligawatta, Methodist Church, Pettah, Hulftsdorp and St. Thomas' Church, Colombo are located within, nearby or associated with Aluthkade East.

Aluthkade East is a surrounded by the New Bazaar, Keselwatta, Masangasweediya, Panchikawatta, Khettarama and Aluthkade West Grama Niladhari Divisions.

Demographics

Ethnicity 

The Aluthkade East Grama Niladhari Division has a Moor majority (83.5%) and a significant Sri Lankan Tamil population (10.5%). In comparison, the Colombo Divisional Secretariat (which contains the Aluthkade East Grama Niladhari Division) has a Moor plurality (40.1%), a significant Sri Lankan Tamil population (31.1%) and a significant Sinhalese population (25.0%)

Religion 

The Aluthkade East Grama Niladhari Division has a Muslim majority (83.9%). In comparison, the Colombo Divisional Secretariat (which contains the Aluthkade East Grama Niladhari Division) has a Muslim plurality (41.8%), a significant Hindu population (22.7%), a significant Buddhist population (19.0%) and a significant Roman Catholic population (13.1%)

Gallery

References 

Grama Niladhari Divisions of Colombo Divisional Secretariat